WikiBase or Wikibase may refer to:

 WikiBase, the software that runs the WikiWikiWeb, the first ever wiki
 Wikibase, a MediaWiki extension that runs Wikidata